Petronet LNG Ltd is an Indian oil and gas company formed by the government of India to import liquefied natural gas (LNG) and set up LNG terminals in the country. It is a joint venture company promoted by the Gas Authority of India Limited (GAIL), Oil and Natural Gas Corporation Limited (ONGC), Indian Oil Corporation Limited (IOC) and Bharat Petroleum Corporation Limited (BPCL). Petronet LNG Limited, one of the companies in the Indian energy sector, has set up the country's first LNG receiving and regasification terminal in Dahej, Gujarat, and another terminal in Kochi, Kerala. While the Dahej terminal has a nominal capacity of 17.5 million tonnes per year (equivalent to 70 million cubic metre per day of natural gas at standard conditions), the Kochi terminal has a capacity of 5 million tonnes per year (equivalent to 20 million cubic metre per day of natural gas). Plans to build a third LNG terminal in Gangavaram, Andhra Pradesh were dropped in October 2019.

Formed as a joint venture by the Government of India to import LNG and set up LNG terminals in the country, it involves India's leading oil and natural gas industry players. Its promoters are GAIL (India) Limited (GAIL), Oil & Natural Gas Corporation Limited (ONGC), Indian Oil Corporation Limited (IOCL) and Bharat Petroleum Corporation Limited (BPCL). The authorized capital is Rs. 3,000 crore ($420 million approx).

The company selected Gaz de France as its strategic partner. The company has also signed an LNG sale and purchase agreements with Qatargas for the supply of 8.5 MTPA LNG to India.

Petronet LNG Ltd has set up its first LNG terminal in Dahej in Gujarat with the capacity of 15 million metric tons per year. Capacity of Dahej Terminal will expand to 17.5 million tons per year till 2019. Another terminal with capacity 5 million tons per year is commissioned in Kochi (Kerala) and started its operations in August 2013. Petronet LNG is planning to set up its third LNG terminal with capacity 5 million tons per year probably in Andhra Pradesh.

Kochi LNG Terminal is situated in the Special Economic Zone (SEZ) of Puthuvypeen near the entrance to Cochin Port, Kerala. The jetty facility at Kochi terminal is designed to receive LNG tankers of capacity from 65,000 m3 up to 216,000 m3, with possibility of receiving suitable smaller ships.

There are various services offered by Petronet LNG Limited, like regasification, storage and reloading, bunkering, gassing-up and cooling-down facilities and LNG truck loading facilities.

In September 2019, PetroNet signed an MoU with United States-based Tellurian Inc to purchase a stake in the latter's Driftwood project in Louisiana and to import 5 million tonnes of LNG annually. The deal was initially expected to be finalized by 31 March 2020, but the non-binding agreement was instead terminated in November 2020 due to low LNG prices adversely affecting the investment case.

Listings and shareholding

References 

 http://economictimes.indiatimes.com/petronet-lng-ltd/stocks/companyid-4495.cms
 http://economictimes.indiatimes.com/industry/energy/oil-gas/petronet-eyes-26-per-cent-stake-in-iocs-lng-terminal-at-ennore/articleshow/60006188.cms

External links

 Official website
 Petronet LNG on BSE India

Oil and gas companies of India
Liquefied natural gas terminals
Companies based in New Delhi
Natural gas companies of India
Indian companies established in 1998
1998 establishments in Delhi
Companies listed on the Bombay Stock Exchange